Franz Starkl (died December 1991) was a Swiss rower. He competed in the men's eight event at the 1948 Summer Olympics.

References

External links
  

Year of birth missing
1991 deaths
Swiss male rowers
Olympic rowers of Switzerland
Rowers at the 1948 Summer Olympics
Place of birth missing